Richard Boucher (1 March 1932 – 26 September 2017) was a French football player and coach with Toulouse FC.

References

 Profile
 Profile

1932 births
2017 deaths
French footballers
France international footballers
Association football defenders
Ligue 1 players
Olympique de Marseille players
French football managers
Toulouse FC managers
Sportspeople from Créteil